Under Colorado Skies is a 1947 American Western film directed by R. G. Springsteen, written by Louise Rousseau, and starring Monte Hale, Lorna Gray, Paul Hurst, William Haade, John Alvin and LeRoy Mason. It was released on December 15, 1947, by Republic Pictures.

Plot

Cast   
Monte Hale as Monte Hale
Lorna Gray as Julia Collins 
Paul Hurst as Lucky John Hawkins
William Haade as Marlowe
John Alvin as Jeff Collins
LeRoy Mason as Faro
Tom London as Sheriff Blanchard
Steve Darrell as Henchman Clip
Gene Evans as Henchman Red
Ted Adams as Doc Thornhill
Steve Raines as Henchman Pony
Hank Patterson as Slim
Foy Willing as Guitar Player Foy Willing
Riders of the Purple Sage as Foy Willing Band

References

External links 
 

1947 films
American Western (genre) films
1947 Western (genre) films
Republic Pictures films
Films directed by R. G. Springsteen
Trucolor films
1940s English-language films
1940s American films